Skycoaster is an amusement park ride produced and managed by Skycoaster Company, LLC.. On the Skycoaster, riders in groups of 1 to 3 are harnessed in specialized Flight Suits, winched to the top of a launch tower, pull the ripcord to engage flight, swing from a cable tether back and forth until brought to a rest. The attraction is often compared to a combination of skydiving, bungee jumping, and hang gliding.

The ride can be found on every continent but Antarctica. Most locations operate as upcharge attractions with an additional fare charged to riders who have already paid general admission to the park.

Many installations use a variation of the Skycoaster model name, whereas others use a custom name like Dare Devil Dive (found at several Six Flags parks) or Xtreme Skyflyer (found at several Cedar Fair parks).

History
William Kitchen, founder of Sky Fun 1 Inc., and Ken Bird originally came up with the idea of the Skycoaster in 1992. They wanted to find a way to let others experience the thrill of jumping out of a plane or the thrills of bungee jumping, but with the safety factor of a merry-go-round. By January 1994, there were four portable models of the ride and 16 permanent fixtures in the United States.

In 1998, Bill Kitchen sold his patents for Skycoaster and most of the Sky Fun 1 Inc. company to ThrillTime Entertainment International Inc. for $12 million. Skycoaster, Inc. was then sold to the Ride Entertainment Group in 2005.

Ride Entertainment introduced Sky Sled in 2017, a new method of riding a Skycoaster. The Sky Sled replaces the flying position with a sitting one. It was first introduced in 2018 at Fun Spot America in Kissimmee, Florida.

Ride Entertainment has partnered with KCL Engineering to offer lighting systems for the Skycoasters and Kool Replay to offer automated video systems.

Production
The company is based in Stevensville, Maryland. Parts are manufactured throughout the United States, with the attractions assembled on site.

The two most common types of Skycoasters are lattice and monopole.  Lattice Skycoasters were manufactured in a variety of sizes, but the 173-dual arch and 100-foot single arch were the most common.  Monopole Skycoasters were manufactured in a variety of sizes, 100-foot single, 100-foot dual, 180-foot single, 180-foot dual, and one 300-foot unit. Earlier Skycoasters have some unique tower structures that do not fall within these categories.

Flight cables are made of  galvanized steel, which supports , or stainless steel, which supports . The 3-ring release system used on the Skycoaster is the same kind used on parachutes.

There are two types of Skycoaster loading systems:

 Rolling boarding platform: A cart is rolled out to and from flight line in order to help the flyers on and off the ride
 Scissors lift: An elevator-like platform is raised up and down to allow flyers on and off the ride.

Skycoaster Installations

References

External links

 
 The Ride Entertainment Group
 A YouTube video of the Skycoaster experience

Amusement rides